Meeting Daddy is a 2000 film written and directed by Peter Gould. It is notably the last of actor Lloyd Bridges' 160 films, and was posthumously released.

Plot
The plot involves a struggling New York-based screenwriter travelling to Savannah, Georgia to meet his girlfriend's eccentric family. It also explores themes of aging.

Cast
 Lloyd Bridges - Mr. Branson
 Josh Charles - Peter Silverblatt
 Alexandra Wentworth - Melanie Branson
 Beau Bridges - Larry Branson
 Walter Olkewicz Dink Branson
 Kristy Swanson - Laurel Lee
 Edie McClurg - Dot
 Cindy Bridges - Becky Sue Branson (as Lucinda Bridges-Cunningham)
 Christopher T. Gray - Taxi Driver
 Don Perry - Mr. Sulak

References

2000 films
2000s English-language films
Films set in Georgia (U.S. state)
Films about writers
Films about ageing
Films with screenplays by Peter Gould